To exhale is to breathe out.

Exhale may also refer to:
 "Exhale (Shoop Shoop)", a 1995 song by Whitney Houston
 "Exhale" (Emina Jahović song), 2008
 "Exhale", a 2001 single by System F and Armin van Buuren
 "Exhale" (Sabrina Carpenter song), 2019
 "Exhalation" (short story), a 2008 short story by Ted Chiang
Exhalation: Stories, a 2019 collection of short stories by Ted Chiang
 Exhale (Plumb album), 2015
 Exhale (Thousand Foot Krutch album), 2016
 Exhale (Arthur Blythe album), 2003
"Exhale", a 2020 single by Kenzie featuring Sia

See also
 Breath (disambiguation)
 Breathe (disambiguation)
 Breathing